Ireneusz Paliński (13 May 1932 – 9 July 2006) was the first Polish weightlifter to win an Olympic gold medal, which he did in 1960. In 1961 he won the middle-heavyweight world title, setting new world records in the clean and jerk and in the total. For these achievements in the same year he was awarded the Order of Polonia Restituta and selected as Polish Sportsperson of the Year. He finished second at the world championships in 1959, 1962–63 and 1966, and third in 1958 and 1964. In total Paliński set six world records in the clean and jerk, which was his favorite event. Domestically he won nine national titles.

Paliński was the oldest of seven brothers born into a poor family. He graduated from a technical university and was a wood craftsman by profession. He took weightlifting while serving in the army. In 1965 he married Zofia Drozdowska, a teacher 13 years his junior. They had two sons, Peter and Adam. Paliński became seriously ill in the early 1990s and had several stomach operations. He died on 9 July 2006, aged 74.

References 

1932 births
2006 deaths
Olympic gold medalists for Poland
Olympic bronze medalists for Poland
Olympic weightlifters of Poland
Polish male weightlifters
Weightlifters at the 1960 Summer Olympics
Weightlifters at the 1964 Summer Olympics
Olympic medalists in weightlifting
People from Ciechanów County
Sportspeople from Masovian Voivodeship
Medalists at the 1964 Summer Olympics
Medalists at the 1960 Summer Olympics
World Weightlifting Championships medalists